The 1997 Stanley Cup playoffs, the playoff tournament of the National Hockey League (NHL), began on April 16, 1997, following the completion of the 1996–97 NHL season. The sixteen teams that qualified, eight from each conference, played best-of-seven series for conference quarter-finals, semi-finals and championships, and then the conference champions played a best-of-seven series for the Stanley Cup.

The Playoffs ended on June 7, with the Detroit Red Wings defeating the Philadelphia Flyers in a four-game sweep to win their eighth Stanley Cup championship in their history, and their first in 42 years. Red Wings goaltender Mike Vernon was awarded the Conn Smythe Trophy as the playoff's Most Valuable Player. It was also the first time since 1967 that the Boston Bruins failed to qualify for the playoffs, ending their 29-year consecutive playoffs appearances record.

Playoff seeds

The following teams qualified for the playoffs:

Eastern Conference
 New Jersey Devils, Atlantic Division champions, Eastern Conference regular season champions – 104 points
 Buffalo Sabres, Northeast Division champions – 92 points
 Philadelphia Flyers – 103 points
 Florida Panthers – 89 points
 New York Rangers – 86 points
 Pittsburgh Penguins – 84 points
 Ottawa Senators – 77 points (31 wins, 8 points head-to-head vs. Montreal)
 Montreal Canadiens – 77 points (31 wins, 2 points head-to-head vs. Ottawa)

Western Conference
 Colorado Avalanche, Pacific Division champions, Western Conference regular season champions, Presidents' Trophy winners – 107 points
 Dallas Stars, Central Division champions – 104 points
 Detroit Red Wings – 94 points
 Mighty Ducks of Anaheim – 85 points
 Phoenix Coyotes – 83 points (38 wins)
 St. Louis Blues – 83 points (36 wins)
 Edmonton Oilers – 81 points (36 wins)
 Chicago Blackhawks – 81 points (34 wins)

Playoff bracket

Conference Quarterfinals

Eastern Conference Quarterfinals

(1) New Jersey Devils vs. (8) Montreal Canadiens

This was the first playoff meeting between these two teams.

Martin Brodeur became the fourth goaltender in league history to score a goal in game one, marking the second time in NHL history that a goaltender had scored a goal in the Stanley Cup playoffs, and the fifth time overall.

(2) Buffalo Sabres vs. (7) Ottawa Senators
This was the first playoff meeting between these two teams. This series marked the first appearance of a team representing Ottawa in the Stanley Cup playoffs in 67 years. The most recent team to represent Ottawa prior to this was the original Ottawa Senators, who lost in the Quarterfinal round in 1930.

(3) Philadelphia Flyers vs. (6) Pittsburgh Penguins
This was the second playoff meeting between these two teams; with Philadelphia winning the only previous series in the 1989 Patrick Division Finals in seven games.

(4) Florida Panthers vs. (5) New York Rangers
This was the first playoff meeting between these two teams. Game 5 was the final playoff game played at Miami Arena.

Western Conference Quarterfinals

(1) Colorado Avalanche vs. (8) Chicago Blackhawks
This was the second consecutive and second overall playoff meeting between these two teams; with Colorado winning last year's series in six games.

(2) Dallas Stars vs. (7) Edmonton Oilers
This was the third playoff meeting between these two teams; with the teams splitting the two previous series. They last met in the 1991 Clarence Campbell Conference Final where the Minnesota North Stars defeated Edmonton in five games.

(3) Detroit Red Wings vs. (6) St. Louis Blues
This was the second consecutive and fifth overall playoff meeting between these two teams; with the teams splitting the four previous series. Detroit won last year's Western Conference Semifinals in seven games.

(4) Mighty Ducks of Anaheim vs. (5) Phoenix Coyotes
This was the first and to date only playoff series between these two teams. This was the first time the cities of Anaheim and Phoenix were represented in the Stanley Cup playoffs.

Conference Semifinals

Eastern Conference Semifinals

(1) New Jersey Devils vs. (5) New York Rangers
This was the third playoff meeting between these two teams; with New York winning both previous series. They last met in the 1994 Eastern Conference Finals, where New York won in seven games.

(2) Buffalo Sabres vs. (3) Philadelphia Flyers
This was the fourth playoff meeting between these two teams; with Philadelphia winning all three previous series. They last met in the 1995 Eastern Conference Quarterfinals, where Philadelphia won in five games.

Western Conference Semifinals

(1) Colorado Avalanche vs. (7) Edmonton Oilers
This was the first playoff meeting between these two teams.

(3) Detroit Red Wings vs. (4) Mighty Ducks of Anaheim
This was the first playoff meeting between these two teams.

Conference Finals

Eastern Conference Final

(3) Philadelphia Flyers vs. (5) New York Rangers
This was the tenth playoff meeting between these two teams, with Philadelphia having won five of the nine previous series. Their most recent meeting was in the 1995 Eastern Conference Semifinals which Philadelphia won in four games. The Rangers made their third Conference Final appearance and first since defeating New Jersey in seven games in 1994. Philadelphia made their fifth Conference Final appearance and first since losing to New Jersey in six games in 1995.

New York out shot Philadelphia in Game 1 25–21, but the Flyers ended up winning 3–1. Wayne Gretzky had his second hat-trick of the playoffs in Game 2 as the Rangers edged the Flyers 5–4. With the series tied at 1–1, the two teams moved to Madison Square Garden in New York for Games 3 and 4. This time, it was the Flyers' Eric Lindros who scored a hat-trick as Philadelphia won 6–3. In Game 4, Lindros broke a 2–2 tie with just seven seconds remaining in regulation, and the Flyers won 3–2. The Rangers scored twice in 26 seconds in the first period to take a 2–1 lead. The Flyers scored three unanswered goals and won the game 4–2 and the series 4–1. This was the last playoff game for both Gretzky and Mark Messier, as neither of the players' teams made the post-season for the rest of their careers.

Western Conference Final

(1) Colorado Avalanche vs. (3) Detroit Red Wings
This was the second playoff meeting between these two teams, with Colorado winning the only previous series. This was a rematch of the previous season's Western Conference Final, which Colorado won in six games. This was Detroit's third straight and fifth overall Conference Finals appearance, while it was Colorado's fourth trip to Conference Final. The rivalry between the two teams was as heated as ever after the events of a brawl during a game on March 26 still fresh.

The Red Wings played a determined Game 1 as Brendan Shanahan broke a scoreless tie at 1:13 of the third period to give Detroit a 1–0 lead. Joe Sakic scored just 27 seconds later and Mike Ricci added another at 6:13 gave Colorado a 2–1 lead that they would not relinquish. In Game 2, Colorado led 2–0 but Detroit pulled to within one on a power-play goal by Igor Larionov at 16:51 of the second period. The Red Wings then went on to score three times in the third period to win 4–2 and tie the series at one game apiece. In Game 3, the Red Wings got two goals from Vyacheslav Kozlov and went on to win 2–1. Detroit also won Game 4, 6–0. Red Wings goaltender Mike Vernon made 19 saves in the shutout and Igor Larionov and Kirk Maltby both scored twice. Detroit now led the series three games to one. Embarrassed and frustrated after such a lopsided loss in Game 4, Colorado came right back in Game 5 with a 6–0 win of their own, with Patrick Roy stopping all 32 shots he faced. Claude Lemieux and Joe Sakic both scored two goals in the victory. In Game 6, the Red Wings looked to close out the series. Sergei Fedorov's goal at 6:11 of the third period gave Detroit a 2–0 lead. Scott Young pulled Colorado to within one on a goal at 14:48, but the Avalanche could not score the equalizer, and Brendan Shanahan sealed the game and series for Detroit with an empty net goal at 19:30.

Stanley Cup Finals

This was the first and to date only playoff series between these two teams. Detroit made their twentieth appearance in the Finals and first since 1995 where they lost to the New Jersey Devils in a four-game sweep. Philadelphia made their seventh appearance in the Finals and first since 1987 when they lost to the Edmonton Oilers in seven games. Detroit last won the Stanley Cup in 1955, while Philadelphia last won the Stanley Cup in 1975.

Playoff statistics

Skaters
These are the top ten skaters based on points.

Goaltenders
This is a combined table of the top five goaltenders based on goals against average and the top five goaltenders based on save percentage, with at least 420 minutes played. The table is sorted by GAA, and the criteria for inclusion are bolded.

See also
 List of Stanley Cup champions
 1996 NHL Entry Draft
 47th National Hockey League All-Star Game
 NHL All-Star Game
 NHL All-Rookie Team
 1997 in sports
 1996–97 NHL season

References

External links
 1997 Stanley Cup playoffs at Hockey Reference

pl
Stanley Cup playoffs